VA-87 has the following meanings:
Attack Squadron 87 (U.S. Navy)
State Route 87 (Virginia)